Jach'a Qullu (Aymara jach'a big, qullu mountain, "big mountain", also spelled Jachcha Kkollu) is a mountain in the Andes of Bolivia which reaches a height of approximately  . It is located in the Oruro Department, Sajama Province, Turco Municipality. Jach'a Qullu lies southwest of Yaritani and Q'ara Qullu and east of Ñuñu Qullu.

References 

Mountains of Oruro Department